Tatyana Ivanovna Tomashova (born 1 July 1975 in Perm) is a Russian distance runner.

Career
At the 2000 Summer Olympics, she competed in the 5000 metres but participated in shorter races thereafter, mainly in the 1500 metres. She is a double world champion and double Olympic silver medallist in this event.

On 31 July 2008, Tomashova was suspended by the IAAF, along with six other Russian track and field athletes, for doping offences. She was charged under IAAF rules 32.2 (b) and 32.2 (e) for a "fraudulent substitution of urine which is both a prohibited method and also a form of tampering with the doping control process". She was set to compete in the 2008 Summer Olympics.

On 20 October 2008, it was announced that Tomashova, along with six other Russian athletes would receive two-year doping bans for manipulating drug samples.

She initially came fourth in the 1500 meters at the 2012 Summer Olympics. However, after doping offences by other athletes, she was promoted to the silver medal position.

Personal bests
 800 metres – 2:02.09 min (2012)
 1000 metres – 2:34.91 min (2005)
 1500 metres – 3:56.91 min (2006)
 3000 metres – 8:25.56 min (2001)
 5000 metres – 14:39.22 min (2001)

International competitions

See also
List of doping cases in athletics
List of Olympic medalists in athletics (women)
Doping at the Olympic Games
List of 2004 Summer Olympics medal winners
List of 2012 Summer Olympics medal winners
List of World Athletics Championships medalists (women)
List of European Athletics Championships medalists (women)

References

External links

 

1975 births
Living people
Sportspeople from Perm, Russia
Russian female middle-distance runners
Russian female long-distance runners
Russian female cross country runners
Olympic female middle-distance runners
Olympic athletes of Russia
Olympic silver medalists for Russia
Olympic silver medalists in athletics (track and field)
Athletes (track and field) at the 2000 Summer Olympics
Athletes (track and field) at the 2004 Summer Olympics
Athletes (track and field) at the 2012 Summer Olympics
Medalists at the 2004 Summer Olympics
Medalists at the 2012 Summer Olympics
Competitors at the 2001 Goodwill Games
Goodwill Games medalists in athletics
World Athletics Championships athletes for Russia
World Athletics Championships medalists
World Athletics Championships winners
European Athletics Championships winners
European Athletics Championships medalists
Russian Athletics Championships winners
Doping cases in athletics
Russian sportspeople in doping cases